Shahpur is a village in Fatehpur district of the Indian state of Uttar Pradesh. It is located in Fatehpur taluk of Fatehpur division.

Geography 

Demographics 

 census, Shahpur had a population of 2,676 with 434 households. The total population constitute, 1,390 males and 1,286 females —a sex ratio of 925 females per 1000 males. 396 children are in the a
ge group of 0–6 years, of which 224 are boys and 172 are girls. The average literacy rate stands at 67.90% with 1,548 literates.

References 

Villages in Fatehpur district